

Series overview 
{| class="wikitable plainrowheaders" style="text-align: center;"
|- class="wikitable" style="text-align: center;"
! style="padding: 0 8px;" colspan="2"| Month
! style="padding: 0 8px;" | Episodes
! style="padding: 0 8px;" | Peak
! style="padding: 0 8px;" | Average Rating
! style="padding: 0 8px;" | Rank
|-
|style="padding: 0 8px; background:#8a1d1d;"| 
| style="padding: 0 8px;" |September 2013
|  style="padding: 0 8px;" |21
| style="padding: 0 8px;" |14.8%  (Pilot Episode)
|  style="padding: 0 8px;" |11.9%
|
|-
|style="padding: 0 8px; background:#042e49;"| 
|style="padding: 0 8px;" |October 2013
|  style="padding: 0 8px;" |23
| style="padding: 0 8px;" |14.1% (Episode 24)
|  style="padding: 0 8px;" |12.6%
|
|-
|style="padding: 0 8px; background:#4f1409;"| 
| style="padding: 0 8px;" |November 2013
|  style="padding: 0 8px;" |11
| style="padding: 0 8px;" |15.4% (Finale Episode)
|  style="padding: 0 8px;" |12.7%
|

|}

Episodes

September 2013

October 2013

November 2013

References 

Lists of Philippine drama television series episodes